Mohammadabad-e Padgan (also Romanized as Moḩammadābād-e Padgān; also known as Moḩammadābād) is a village in Karvandar Rural District, in the Central District of Khash County, Sistan and Baluchestan Province, Iran. At the 2006 census, its population was 85, in 18 families.

References 

Populated places in Khash County